Anne Boleyn is a British three-part psychological thriller miniseries developed for Channel 5 starring Jodie Turner-Smith in the titular role. It was written by Eve Hedderwick Turner and directed by Lynsey Miller with historian Dan Jones as executive producer.

Premise
The series is set in Anne's final five months prior to her execution by beheading for treason in 1536.

Cast

 Jodie Turner-Smith as Anne Boleyn
 Mark Stanley as Henry VIII
 Paapa Essiedu as George Boleyn
 Barry Ward as Thomas Cromwell
 Amanda Burton as Anne Shelton
 Lola Petticrew as Jane Seymour
 Thalissa Teixeira as Madge Shelton
 Isabella Laughland as Elizabeth Browne
 Anna Brewster as Jane Boleyn
 Kris Hitchen as the Duke of Norfolk
 Turlough Convery as Henry Norris
 Jamael Westman as Edward Seymour
 Phoenix Di Sebastiani as Eustace Chapuys

 Aoife Hinds as Princess Mary

 James Harkness as William Kingston
 Abhin Galeya as Thomas Cranmer

Episodes

Production

Development
Ben Frow of Channel 5 first mentioned the project at the Edinburgh Fringe Festival in summer 2020. The three-part "convention-defying" series from Fable Pictures was officially announced in October 2020, with Eve Hedderwick Turner as writer and Lynsey Miller as director. Faye Ward and Hannah Farrell of Fable produced and historian Dan Jones executive produced. The series "sets out to examine Anne Boleyn's life through a feminist lens as she struggles to conceive a boy heir and pushback against the society she was born into."

Casting
In October 2020, it was announced with the series that Jodie Turner-Smith would star as Anne Boleyn with Paapa Essiedu, Amanda Burton, Thalissa Teixeira, Barry Ward, and Jamael Westman also set to feature. Mark Stanley joined the cast as Henry VIII in November.

Filming
Principal photography took place in Yorkshire over six weeks, finishing in December 2020. Filming locations included Castle Howard in North Yorkshire, Bolton Castle in Wensleydale, Bolton Abbey in Wharfedale, Oakwell Hall in Birstall, St Michael's Church in Emley, Harewood House in Harewood, and Ripley Castle in Ripley.

Release
The first episode premiered in the UK on Channel 5 on 1 June 2021. Sony Pictures Television co-financed the project with Channel 5 and distributed the series internationally. The drama was released in the United States on AMC+ and on Crave in Canada.

Reception
Review aggregator Rotten Tomatoes reported an approval rating of 53% based on 17 critic reviews, with an average rating of 6.2/10. The website's critics consensus reads, "Though the show around her isn't quite up to snuff, there's no denying the pleasure of Jodie Turner-Smith's powerful turn as the one-and-only Anne Boleyn."

The Guardian and The Independent both gave the drama 3 stars out 5. Lucy Mangan of the former said the series "works" but criticised its "silly surplus of metaphors" and portrayal of Henry. Adam White of the latter found the show a "soapy romp" but that it made sense for the story being told. Turner-Smith's performance was widely praised. Beth Webb of Empire called the series a "showcase of Jodie Turner-Smith's resilience as a performer" and mentioned how the "small but well-assembled supporting cast elevates her performance".

There was some criticism of the color-blind casting, as some of the actors were Black and the characters portrayed were White, such as Boleyn herself. The Radio Times described this as "identity-conscious casting" and quoted the actor Mark Stanley: "It was all about this being the right person for the job, rather than what we as a society might perceive as the ‘right look’ for the job".

References

External links
 
 

2021 British television series debuts
2021 British television series endings
2020s British drama television series
2020s British television miniseries
British fantasy television series
Channel 5 (British TV channel) original programming
Television series by Sony Pictures Television
Cultural depictions of Anne Boleyn
English-language television shows